A pitch drop experiment is a long-term experiment which measures the flow of a piece of pitch over many years. 'Pitch' is the name for any of a number of highly viscous liquids which appear solid, most commonly bitumen, also known as asphalt. At room temperature, tar pitch flows at a very low rate, taking several years to form a single drop.

University of Queensland experiment

The best-known version of the experiment was started in 1927 by Professor Thomas Parnell of the University of Queensland in Brisbane, Australia, to demonstrate to students that some substances which appear solid are highly viscous fluids. Parnell poured a heated sample of the pitch into a sealed funnel and allowed it to settle for three years. In 1930, the seal at the neck of the funnel was cut, allowing the pitch to start flowing. A glass dome covers the funnel and it is placed on display outside a lecture theatre. Large droplets form and fall over a period of about a decade.

The seventh drop fell at approximately 4:45 p.m. on 3 July 1988, while the experiment was on display at Brisbane's World Expo 88. However, apparently no one witnessed the drop fall itself; Professor Mainstone had stepped out to get a drink at the moment it occurred.

The eighth drop fell on 28 November 2000, allowing experimenters to calculate the pitch as having a viscosity of approximately 230 billion times that of water.

This experiment is recorded in Guinness World Records as the 'world's longest continuously running laboratory experiment', and it is expected there is enough pitch in the funnel to allow it to continue for at least another hundred years. This experiment is predated by two other (still-active) scientific devices; the Oxford Electric Bell (1840) and the Beverly Clock (1864), but each of these has experienced brief interruptions since 1937.

The experiment was not originally carried out under any special controlled atmospheric conditions, meaning the viscosity could vary throughout the year with fluctuations in temperature.  Sometime after the seventh drop fell (1988), air conditioning was added to the location where the experiment takes place. The lower average temperature has lengthened each drop's stretch before it separates from the rest of the pitch in the funnel, and correspondingly the typical interval between drops has increased from eight years to 12–13 years.

In October 2005, John Mainstone and the late Thomas Parnell were awarded the Ig Nobel Prize in physics, a parody of the Nobel Prize, for the pitch drop experiment. Mainstone subsequently commented:

The experiment is monitored by a webcam but technical problems prevented the November 2000 drop from being recorded. The pitch drop experiment is on public display on Level 2 of Parnell building in the School of Mathematics and Physics at the St Lucia campus of the University of Queensland. Hundreds of thousands of Internet users check the live stream each year.

Professor John Mainstone died on 23 August 2013, aged 78, following a stroke. Custodianship then passed to Professor Andrew White.

The ninth drop touched the eighth drop on 17 April 2014; however, it was still attached to the funnel. On 24 April, Professor White decided to replace the beaker holding the previous eight drops before the ninth drop fused to them (which would have permanently affected the ability of further drops to form). While the bell jar was being lifted, the wooden base wobbled and the ninth drop snapped away from the funnel.

In mid-March 2018, the live feed was interrupted due to technical problems in the experiment's webpage. Since mid-October 2020, the live feed is back online on the experiment's webpage.

Timeline
Timeline for the University of Queensland experiment:

 After the 7th drop, air conditioning was installed, lowering the average temperature.
 12 April 2014: 9th drop touched 8th drop; 24 April 2014: 9th drop separated from funnel during beaker change.

Trinity College Dublin experiment
The pitch drop experiment at Trinity College Dublin in Ireland was started in October 1944 by an unknown colleague of the Nobel Prize winner Ernest Walton while he was in the physics department of Trinity College. This experiment, like the one at University of Queensland, was set up to demonstrate the high viscosity of pitch. This physics experiment sat on a shelf in a lecture hall at Trinity College unmonitored for decades as it dripped a number of times from the funnel to the receiving jar below, also gathering layers of dust.

In April 2013, about a decade after the previous pitch drop, physicists at Trinity College noticed that another drip was forming. They moved the experiment to a table to monitor and record the falling drip with a webcam, allowing all present to watch.  The pitch dripped around 17:00 IST on 11 July 2013, marking the first time that a pitch drop was successfully recorded on camera.

Based on the results from this experiment, the Trinity College physicists estimated that the viscosity of the pitch is about two million times that of honey, or about 20 billion times the viscosity of water.

University of St. Andrews experiment
A pitch drop experiment was begun in the same year as the Queensland experiment at the University of St. Andrews. No evidence has emerged of any contact between Parnell and the instigator or instigators of the St. Andrews experiment. The pitch in the St. Andrews experiment flows in a largely steady, but extremely slow, stream.

Aberystwyth University experiment
In 2014, media reported that a pitch drop experiment had been recently rediscovered at Aberystwyth University in Wales. Dating from 1914, it predates the Queensland experiment by 13 years. But as the pitch is more viscous (or the average temperature lower) this experiment has not yet produced its first drop and is not expected to for over 1,000 years.

Demonstrations of Lord Kelvin

In the Hunterian Museum at the University of Glasgow are two pitch-based demonstrations by Lord Kelvin from the 19th century. Kelvin placed some bullets on top of a dish of pitch, and corks at the bottom: over time, the bullets sank and the corks floated.

Lord Kelvin also showed that the pitch flows like glaciers, with a mahogany ramp that allowed it to slide slowly downward and form shapes and patterns similar to glaciers in the Alps.

See also

 Rheology
 William James Beal, botanist who started a long-running seed germination experiment in 1879
 Oxford Electric Bell, ringing nearly continuously from 1840
 The E. coli long-term evolution experiment (LTEE), a study in experimental evolution running since 1988.

References

External links

 
 
 
 

Fluid dynamics
Physics experiments
University of Queensland